Astudillo Glacier is a small glacier flowing into Paradise Harbor between Leith Cove and Skontorp Cove on the Danco Coast of Graham Land. The glacier was surveyed by the Chilean Antarctic Expedition of 1950–51, which applied the name, probably after an expedition member.

See also
 List of glaciers in the Antarctic
 Glaciology

References

 

Glaciers of Danco Coast